Grandidier's gecko (Geckolepis typica) is a species of lizard in the family Gekkonidae. It is endemic to Madagascar.

References

Geckolepis
Endemic fauna of Madagascar
Reptiles of Madagascar
Reptiles described in 1867
Taxa named by Alfred Grandidier